The Sumka (Sumka) is a river in Zelenodolsky District of the  Republic of Tatarstan, Russia, a left-bank tributary of the Volga. It begins near Gremyachy Klyuch and flows to the Kuybyshev Reservoir, Volga, forming the western border of Vasilyevo, Tatarstan.

The river valley comes through the Raifa section of the Volga-Kama Reserve. There the Sumka passes several major lakes, the biggest being Raifa lake. The river used to dry up in summer.

References

Rivers of Tatarstan